John Poston (born May 1958) is an American politician and member of the Minnesota House of Representatives. A member of the Republican Party of Minnesota, he represents District 9A in north-central Minnesota.

Early life, education, and career
Poston was born in May 1958 in Minneapolis, Minnesota, where he was initially raised. He was later raised in Aitkin, Minnesota. He later moved to Des Moines, Iowa when his father was transferred there and graduated from high school in Earlham, Iowa. He attended Des Moines Area Community College.

Poston worked for Payless Cashways while attending college, becoming an assistant manager and later manager. He later worked for Home Depot. Finally, he worked for Sally Beauty Holdings for 20 years, becoming a retail executive. In 2011, Poston bought Sherwood Forest, a restaurant in Lake Shore, Minnesota.

Poston founded a Kids Against Hunger in the Brainerd Lakes area in 2012. He has been a volunteer for Teen Challenge and Essentia Health. Poston is a member of the Nisswa Chamber of Commerce board, the Region Five Economic Development Commission, the National Joint Powers Alliance, Happy Dancing Turtle, Central Lakes Rotary, the Nisswa Lions Club.

Poston was a member of the Lake Shore park committee, later becoming its chair. He was later appointed a member of the Lake Shore City Council in 2011 and later elected mayor in 2015.

Minnesota House of Representatives
Poston was elected to the Minnesota House of Representatives in 2016.

Poston won his first election in 2016 with 68% of the vote. He was re-elected in 2018 with 69.34%.

Poston's 2019-2020 Committee Assignments include:
Agriculture and Food Finance and Policy Division, 
Corrections Division, 
Public Safety and Criminal Justice Reform Finance and Policy Division

Personal life
Poston is single and resides in Lake Shore, Minnesota. He is a member of the Lutheran Church of the Cross in Nisswa, Minnesota.

References

External links

 Official House of Representatives website
 Official campaign website

1958 births
Living people
Republican Party members of the Minnesota House of Representatives
21st-century American politicians
People from Cass County, Minnesota
People from Aitkin, Minnesota
People from Nisswa, Minnesota